Red Hot Tires may refer to:
 Red Hot Tires (1925 film), an American silent comedy film
 Red Hot Tires (1935 film), an American crime drama film